Kalobatippus ('stilt walking horse') was a genus of Anchitheriinae Equid. It gets its name from the elongated bones between the ankle/wrist and the toes. Kalobatippus ate leaves and was characterized by unusually long legs. It lived 24 to 19 million years ago.

References 

Extinct mammals of North America
Oligocene mammals
Miocene horses